La belle au bois dormant is another name for Sleeping Beauty. La belle au bois dormant may also refer to:

 La belle au bois dormant (Carafa): 1825 opera by Michele Carafa
 La belle au bois dormant (Lecocq): 1900 opéra comique by Charles Lecocq
 La belle au bois dormant, another name for The Sleeping Beauty (ballet)